Leonardo Lupi (born 2 October 1972) is a Venezuelan footballer. He played in two matches for the Venezuela national football team from 1993 to 2000. He was also part of Venezuela's squad for the 1993 Copa América tournament.

References

External links
 

1972 births
Living people
Venezuelan footballers
Venezuela international footballers
Place of birth missing (living people)
Association football defenders
Trujillanos FC players